Tony Newman may refer to:
Tony Newman (drummer) (born 1943), English rock drummer
Tony Newman, 2004 election candidate for the Australian Progressive Alliance
Tony Newman, a DJ and talk radio presenter from Capital Radio 604 and Red Rose 999

See also
Anthony Newman (disambiguation)